Gustav Schäfer (22 September 1906 – 10 December 1991) was a German rower who competed in the 1936 Summer Olympics.

He was born in Johanngeorgenstadt. In 1911, his family moved to Dresden. Schäfer's sporting career started in swimming. After school, he trained as a baker. He first tried rowing in 1929 when a rowing club in the suburb of Blasewitz made its club house available for a dance; he started training in March 1929.

At the 1936 Summer Olympics he won the gold medal in the single sculls competition. He died in Munich in 1991.

References

External links
 profile

1906 births
1991 deaths
People from Johanngeorgenstadt
People from the Kingdom of Saxony
German male rowers
Sportspeople from Saxony
Rowers at the 1936 Summer Olympics
Olympic rowers of Germany
Medalists at the 1936 Summer Olympics
Olympic medalists in rowing
Olympic gold medalists for Germany
European Rowing Championships medalists